North 1 East is the sixth tier of the English rugby union domestic competition, formed in 1987 using the name North Division 2, involving clubs from the north of the country. There was also division known as North East 1 that began in 1987 for clubs based in the north-east but this was a seventh (later eighth) tier league. North Division 2 would later split into two regional divisions, currently known as North 1 East and North 1 West. North 1 East is made up of teams from around the
North East and Yorkshire, who play home and away matches throughout a winter season.

The league champions are automatically promoted to the North Premier, whilst the second placed team enters into a play-off match with the second placed team in the equivalent Division North 1 West. The bottom three teams are relegated to either the Yorkshire Division One or the Counties 1 Durham & Northumberland leagues, the seventh tier of the English domestic rugby union competition. Following the play-off game, depending on the result, a team from the division with fifteen teams are transferred to the division with thirteen teams to level up the number of teams in each division.

2021–22

Kendal finished 5th in N1E in 2019-20 but were level transferred to North 1 West for the current season to address an imbalance of teams.

The teams competing in 2021-22 achieved their places in the league based on performances in 2019-20, the 'previous season' column in the table below refers to that season not 2020-21.

2020–21

On 30 October 2020 the RFU announced  that due to the coronavirus pandemic a decision had been taken to cancel Adult Competitive Leagues (National League 1 and below) for the 2020/21 season meaning North 1 East was not contested.

2019–20

Original teams
When league rugby began in 1987 this was a single division containing the following teams from the north of England:

Alnwick
Aspatria
Bradford & Bingley
Davenport   
Halifax
Huddersfield
Lymm
Manchester
New Brighton
Sandal
Wilmslow

Division honours

North Division 2 (1987–1993)

The original North Division 2 was a tier 6 league with promotion up to North Division 1 and relegation down to either North East 1 or North West 1.

North Division 2 (1993–1996)

The creation of National 5 North for the 1993–94 season, meant that North Division 2 dropped from being a tier 6 league to a tier 7 league for the years that National 5 North was active.

North Division 2 (1996–2000)

The cancellation of National 5 North at the end of the 1995–96 season meant that North Division 2 reverted to being a tier 6 league.

North 2 East

For the 2000–01 season, North Division 2 was split into two regional divisions - North 2 East and North 2 West.  While promotion continued up into North Division 1, the cancellation of the North East 1, North East 2 and North East 3 meant that relegation was now to either Durham/Northumberland 1 or Yorkshire 1.

North 1 East

For the 2009–10 season the division would be renamed North 1 East as part of wholesale national restructure of the league system by the RFU leading to mass changes at all levels including in the north.

Promotion play-offs
Since the 2000–01 season there has been a play-off between the runners-up of North 1 East and North 1 West for the third and final promotion place to North Premier. The team with the superior league record has home advantage in the tie.  At the end of the 2019–20 season the North 1 East have been the most successful with thirteen wins to the North 1 West teams six; and the home team has won promotion on fifteen occasions compared to the away teams five.

Number of league titles

Bradford & Bingley (3)
Billingham (2)
Cleckheaton (2)
Penrith (2)
West Hartlepool (2)
Alnwick (1)
Aspatria (1)
Beverley (1)
Darlington Mowden Park (1)
Doncaster (1)
Doncaster Phoenix (1)
Halifax (1)
Hull (1)
Ilkley (1)
Macclesfield (1)
Manchester (1)
Middlesbrough (1)  
Morpeth (1)
New Brighton (1)
Northern (1)
Pocklington (1)
Rotherham (1) 
Stockton (1) 
Westoe (1) 
Wharfedale (1)
York (1)

See also
 Durham RFU
 Northumberland RFU
 Yorkshire RFU
 English rugby union system
 Rugby union in England

Notes

References

6